Brent Walter Roberts is an American social and personality psychologist who is professor of psychology at the University of Illinois at Urbana–Champaign. He is known for his research on personality traits, especially conscientiousness and narcissism. He is the president of the Association for Research in Personality, and was named an ISI Highly Cited Researcher in 2016 and 2017. In 2014 he presented the Paul B. Baltes Lecture at the Berlin-Brandenburg Academy of Sciences and Humanities. His daughter, Siena Roberts, is the American University Washington College of Law 2022 1L Section 2 Representative.

References

External links
Faculty page

University of California, Berkeley alumni
Living people
University of Tulsa faculty
University of Illinois Urbana-Champaign faculty
American social psychologists
Personality psychologists
Year of birth missing (living people)